Lac Brochet 197A is a Dene Indian reserve of the Northlands Denesuline First Nation, located in the boreal forest of northern Manitoba, Canada.

The reserve contains the unincorporated community of Lac Brochet, which is the administrative centre of the Northlands Denesuline First Nation. There are no permanent roads connecting Lac Brochet with other parts of Manitoba (there are some that are passable only during the winter). Many residents travel using the Lac Brochet Airport located near town.

Petit Casimir Memorial School is the K-12 school in the community.

Northlands Denesuline First Nation
The Lac Brochet community is the administrative centre of the Northlands Denesuline First Nation.

As of September 2021, the total membership of Northland Denesuline First Nation was 1,153 with 975 members living on-reserve and 173 members living off-reserve. The First Nation is governed by a Chief and six councillors and is affiliated with the Keewatin Tribal Council. The Keewatin Tribal Council with its head office in Thompson represents eleven First Nations in Northern Manitoba.

Demographics
In the 2016 Canadian Census 530 residents of Lac Brochet chose Dene as their mother tongue and 5 chose Cree as their first language. English was spoken by most of the population.

References

Indian reserves in Manitoba
Hudson's Bay Company trading posts
Dene communities
Keewatin Tribal Council